Northern Albania is one of the three NUTS-2 Regions of Albania. This  ethnographical territory is sometimes referred to as Ghegeria which also includes parts of the Albanian-inhabited territories of Kosovo, Montenegro, North Macedonia and Serbia.

It consists of the counties of Dibër, Durrës, Kukës, Lezhë and Shkodër.

The northeastern mountain regions have substantial reserves of metallic mineral deposits, including chromium, copper, and iron-nickel. In the 1980s Albania was a world leader in chromium production, but output fell precipitously in the early 1990s during the political transition from communism.

The term usually denotes to the northern half of the country inhabited by the Ghegs, who predominantly live in the mountainous north of the Shkumbin river.

See also
Southern Albania (Toskeria)
Central Albania

References

Subdivisions of Albania
NUTS 2 statistical regions of Albania